Joseph Dawkins, III born January 27, 1948, in Los Angeles is a former American football running back in the National Football League for the Houston Oilers, Denver Broncos, and the New York Giants.  He played college football at the University of Wisconsin and was drafted in the tenth round of the 1970 NFL Draft.

1948 births
Living people
Players of American football from Los Angeles
American football running backs
Wisconsin Badgers football players
Houston Oilers players
Denver Broncos players
New York Giants players